Maxime Livio (born 27 July 1987) is a French eventing rider. He competed at two World Equestrian Games (in 2014 and 2018).

At the 2014 World Equestrian Games held in Normandy, France, Livio initially ranked 4th in both individual and team events, but was later disqualified after his horse Qalao des Mers tested positive for hydroxyethylpromazine sulfoxide. This resulted in France losing their Olympic qualification berth for Rio 2016. At the 2018 World Equestrian Games held in Tryon, North Carolina, Livio won a team bronze medal and placed 11th individually riding Opium de Verrieres.

Maxime Livio has earned four CCI5*-L podiums, including a victory at the Étoiles de Pau in 2016.

References

External links
 

Living people
1987 births
French male equestrians
Event riders
Doping cases in equestrian